In scientific visualization a streamlet is used to visualize flows. It is essentially a short streamline segment.  Normally the length of a streamlet is proportional to the flow magnitude at its seed point.

References

Fluid dynamics